Remo land is made up of some towns that included Makun, Offin, Ikenne and about thirty (30) other neighboring towns to Ijebu Kingdom in Nigeria. The capital is Sagamu which was settled in 1872 when thirteen towns congregated together for greater security.

Remo land was initially settled roughly around the second half of the 15th century and they claimed their ancestry from Iremo in Ile Ife. Although, there is a strong homogeneity in culture with their Ijebu Kingdom neighbor, they however considered themselves not part of Ijebu Kingdom at least based on recent history. They have their own kingdom called Remo land with their own dominant ruling family since around the early 16th century. However, based on past history, there had been periods when they had been vassal kingdom to the Ijebu Kingdom but the Akarigbos had been distinct from the King of Ijebu kingdom from time immemorial

This is a list of the Akarigbos of Remo, the Oba or King of Remo Land

Kings of Remo

 Akarigbo
 Aroyewun
 Odusote(Kilaro)
 Radolu
 Koyelu
 Muleruwa
 Torungbuwa I
 Anoko
 Liyangu
 Otutubiosun
 Erinjugbotan
 Faranpojo the Great (Responsible for the relocation of the capital from Remo to Shagamu, during the Yoruba Wars mid 19th century)
 Igimisoje
 Dueja
 Oyebajo
 Adedoyin II
 Awolesi
 Adeniyi(Also known as Sonariwo)
 Babatunde Adewale Ajayi, Torungbuwa II Present Oba
Ayangburen of ikorodu.

References

Yoruba history
Remo
Nigeria-related lists